Brock Wright (born November 27, 1998) is an American football tight end for the Detroit Lions of the National Football League (NFL). He played college football at Notre Dame.

College career
Wright played college football at Notre Dame where he appeared in 48 games with 11 starts. He had seven receptions for 78 yards and one touchdown during his career at Notre Dame.

Professional career

Detroit Lions
On May 1, 2021, Wright signed with the Detroit Lions as an undrafted free agent after the 2021 NFL Draft. On October 23, 2021, Wright was activated from the practice squad by the Lions for the team's week 7 game against the Los Angeles Rams. He was signed to the active roster on November 8. On December 5, 2021, Wright scored his first NFL touchdown versus the Minnesota Vikings on a 23-yard pass from Jared Goff.

On December 18, 2022, in a Week 15 game at the New York Jets, Wright scored the go-ahead touchdown on a 51-yard pass from Goff on 4th down and inches with 1:49 remaining in the game. The Lions held on for the 20-17 win — improving their record to 7-7 and keeping their playoff hopes alive in the NFC.

References

1998 births
Living people
Players of American football from Texas
American football tight ends
Notre Dame Fighting Irish football players
Detroit Lions players
People from Cypress, Texas